Servitude may refer to:

Persons
 Conscription
 Indentured servitude
 Involuntary servitude
 Penal servitude
 Service
 Service-oriented submission
 Slavery

Property
 Equitable servitude, a term of real estate law
 Servitude in civil law, a kind of interest in property